Bruno Pianissolla or simply Bruno, (born in Guarapari, on February 5, 1987) is a Brazilian goalkeeper currently playing for América de Natal.

Contract
Santa Cruz (Loan) 1 January 2008 to 31 May 2008
Cruzeiro 2 May 2007 to 31 December 2010
Ipatinga 6 July 2010 to 31 December 2014

External links
 CBF
 Guardian Stats Centre
 zerozero.pt
 sambafoot
 globoesporte
 cruzeiro.com

1987 births
Living people
Brazilian footballers
Cruzeiro Esporte Clube players
Santa Cruz Futebol Clube players
Ipatinga Futebol Clube players
Association football goalkeepers